USS R-3 (SS-80) was an R-class coastal and harbor defense submarine of the United States Navy.

Construction and commissioning
R-3′s keel was laid down on 11 December 1917 by the Fore River Shipbuilding Company in Quincy, Massachusetts. She was launched on 18 January 1919, sponsored by Mrs. Charles G. McCord, and commissioned on 17 April 1919 at Boston, Massachusetts.

Service history

1919–1934
After shakedown off the Massachusetts coast, R-3 was assigned to Submarine Division 9 at New London, Connecticut. She departed New London with the coaling ship  on 4 December 1919 for Norfolk, Virginia and a winter deployment with the division in the Gulf of Mexico from 13 January to 27 March 1920. Given hull classification symbol SS-80 in July, she sailed on 13 September for Norfolk and overhaul.

R-3 was transferred to the Pacific with Division 9 on 8 April, transited the Panama Canal on 28 May, and arrived 30 June at her new base, San Pedro, California. After operating for two years in California waters, she was transferred 16 July 1923 to Pearl Harbor where she was stationed for the next years, engaging in training and operations with fleet units.

R-3 was reassigned 12 December 1930 to the Atlantic Fleet for duty with Division 4, arriving 9 February 1931 at New London. After acting as a training ship at the Submarine School, New London for five months, she was ordered 6 May to Washington, DC, for air purification tests by the Naval Research Laboratory. In 1932, R-3 conducted sound and radio experiments for the laboratory and trained personnel from the Deep Sea Diving School off Piney Point, Maryland.

R-3 was placed in reduced commission 26 April 1933 and after testing low-pressure valves for the Naval Research Laboratory, departed for Annapolis, Maryland, on 2 June 1933 where she served as a training ship for future generations of submariners.  She sailed 22 February 1934 for Guantanamo Bay and sound operations with Eagle 58, followed by training duty at Washington, DC, with the Deep Sea Diving School. R-3 was decommissioned 10 August 1934 at Philadelphia, Pennsylvania.

1940–1948
R-3 recommissioned 19 August 1940 at New London, was attached to Division 42, and after a brief period at New London, 23 October to 10 December, headed for Coco Solo. Patrols and training duties followed and in mid-1941 she returned to New London to prepare for transfer to the Royal Navy. Decommissioned and transferred 4 November 1941, R-3 was struck from the Naval Vessel Register on 7 November 1941. Unfit for service after the war, she was scrapped at Troon, Scotland, in 1948.

References

External links
 

 

United States R-class submarines
Ships built in Quincy, Massachusetts
1919 ships
Ships transferred from the United States Navy to the Royal Navy
United States R-class submarines of the Royal Navy
World War II submarines of the United Kingdom